Giulia Recli (1890 – 19 December 1970) was an Italian composer and essayist.

Born in Milan, Recli was a student under Ildebrando Pizzetti and Victor de Sabata, learning piano, composition and singing. She was awarded first and second prizes at New York musical competitions. Recli's works were introduced to American audiences by Tullio Serafin. In 1926, at a Metropolitan Opera concert headlining Belgian violinist, César Thomson, Recli's Chimes at Sunrise was performed. In 1931, Recli's Nicolette s'Endorte, described by The New York Times as a "graceful lullaby", was performed at the Metropolitan Opera by Mario Vitetta (solo violin) in a concert devoted to the French Tenor Georges Thill. In 1965 a concert of her work and three other female composers was performed in Rome at an RAI symphony concert.

References

1890 births
1970 deaths
Musicians from Milan
20th-century Italian composers
20th-century women composers